Calcutta is a village in the Corozal District of Belize.

History
After the British put down the Sepoy Mutiny in India, the British Parliament ordered 1000 Indians who had supported the rebellion removed from India and transported to British Honduras. They worked on plantations in Corozal District, and Calcutta was one of the settlements they founded.

References

External links
http://www.nlsbze.bz/EastIndians.html

Populated places in Corozal District